Patrick Carrigan (5 July 1898 – 1957) was a Scottish footballer who played in the Football League for Leicester City and Sheffield United.

References

1898 births
1957 deaths
Scottish footballers
Association football defenders
English Football League players
Douglas Water Thistle F.C. players
Leicester City F.C. players
Sheffield United F.C. players
Southend United F.C. players
Hinckley United F.C. players